Acronius is a surname. Notable people with the surname include:

 Johannes Acronius (1565–1627), Frisian-German theologian
 Johannes Acronius Frisius (1520–1564), Frisian-Dutch mathematician and doctor
 Ruard Acronius (1546–1612), Frisian-Dutch theologian

See also 
 Akron
 Acron (disambiguation)